Overseas Citizenship of India (OCI) is a form of permanent residency available to people of Indian origin and their spouses which allows them to live and work in India indefinitely. Despite its name, OCI status is not citizenship and does not grant the right to vote in Indian elections or hold public office. The Indian government can revoke OCI status in a wide variety of circumstances. In addition, the OCI Card is only valid with valid international passport. As of 2020, there are 6 million holders of OCI cards among the Indian Overseas diaspora. 

The OCI scheme was introduced by The Citizenship (Amendment) Act, 2005 in response to demands for dual citizenship by the Indian diaspora. It provides overseas citizens many of the rights available to resident citizens.

OCI status is not available to anyone who has ever been a Pakistani or Bangladeshi citizen, or who is a child, grandchild, or great-grandchild of such a person.

History
The Constitution of India does not permit dual citizenship (under article 9). Indian authorities have interpreted the law to mean that a person cannot have a second country's passport simultaneously with an Indian one — even in the case of a child who is claimed by another country as a citizen of that country, and who may be required by the laws of the other country to use one of its passports for foreign travel (such as a child born in United States or in Canada to Indian parents), and the Indian courts have given the executive branch wide discretion over this matter.

On the recommendations of a High-Level Committee on Indian Diaspora, the Government of India decided to register Persons of Indian Origin (PIOs) of a certain category, as has been specified in the Section 7A of the Citizenship Act, 1955, as Overseas Citizenship of India (OCI) holders, by the Citizenship (Amendment) Act, 2003.

The OCI program was launched during the Pravasi Bharatiya Divas convention held in Hyderabad on 9 January 2006.

Before 9 January 2015, travelers holding an OCI card were required to carry the passport which contained the lifelong "U" visa stamp while traveling to India. This requirement was done away with that day and OCI holders no longer require the lifetime visa stamp passport. The OCI card (the blue-grey booklet) in conjunction with a valid foreign passport is sufficient to travel to and from India.

In March 2020, visa-free travel granted to OCI holders was put on hold until 15 April due to the coronavirus pandemic.

On 4 March 2021, the rights of OCI holders were slightly curtailed. In order to perform certain activities or visit certain areas in India, OCI holders now require a Protected Area Permit, a requirement for PIO holders which OCI never had since its launch in 2006. Also, OCI holders living in India need to register with the Foreigners Regional Registration Officer (FRRO) via email upon every change of their permanent home address or occupation.

On 15 April 2021, the number of times OCI needs to be renewed got reduced down to only once, when the passport is renewed for the first time after age 20. However, every time the passport is renewed before age 20 and when the passport is renewed for the first time after age 50, a copy of the current passport along with the current passport-sized photo needs to be uploaded onto the OCI online portal. These relaxed OCI renewal guidelines reduce the administrative burden caused by multiple OCI renewals.

Comparison

Notes

Eligibility
The Government of India, on application, may register as an Overseas Citizen of India, any person who:
 is a citizen of another country, but was a citizen of India on 26 January 1950 or at any time thereafter; or
 is a citizen of another country, but belonged to a territory that became part of India after 15 August 1947; or
 is a citizen of another country, but was eligible to become a citizen of India on 26 January 1950; or
 is a child or a grandchild or a great-grandchild of such a citizen; or
 is a minor child of such persons mentioned above; or
 is a minor child and whose both parents are citizens of India or one of the parents is a citizen of India; or 
 is a spouse of foreign origin of a citizen of India or spouse of foreign origin of an Overseas Citizen of India holder registered under section 7A of the Citizenship Act, 1955 and whose marriage has been registered and subsisted for a continuous period of not less than two years immediately preceding the presentation of the application.

A person, who or either of whose parents or grandparents or great grandparents is or had been a citizen of Pakistan or Bangladesh, is ineligible for registration as an Overseas Citizen of India.

A person who has served as a member of any foreign military, including that of his home country, is ineligible to receive an OCI card, except when bound by their home country to serve under their local law. For this reason, Israeli citizens of Indian origin are exempt from this rule and are eligible for OCI even if they served in the Israel Defence Forces.

Dutch nationals of Surinamese origin up to the sixth generation whose forefathers came from India in the 19th century will be eligible for applying for an OCI card.

Revoking the OCI card
Previously, the government could cancel OCI status of people who obtained it by fraud, showed acts of unpatriotism, or broke a law punishable with at least two years in jail before five years of having issued OCI. The Citizenship (Amendment) Act, 2019 gives the government additional power to strip people of their OCI status if they violate any local law, whether it is a petty infraction or a heinous felony. The new act makes the rules much more strict for OCI holders in an attempt to preserve OCI's dignity, however it also has a proviso that gives the person whose OCI status is at stake the right to be heard by the government before they come to a verdict.

Application
Applications for OCI can only be made online at ociservices.gov.in. A person making an application is required to submit a photograph and several identification documents to prove they meet the eligibility criteria, and also must pay an application fee. Applications made from outside India are charged a fee of US$275.

The applicant must provide proof of their current citizenship by presenting a copy of their current passport that has a validity of at least 6 months from the time of application. If the applicant is making their application while within Indian jurisdiction, they must submit a copy of any type of Indian visa (other than missionary and mountaineering visa), or a residential permit with at least 3 months' validity. Applicants must provide evidence that either they or their parents or grandparents or great grandparents meet the eligibility criteria described above. This can be done by presenting a copy of an Indian passport, a copy of the Domicile Certificate issued by the competent authority, a copy of Nativity Certificate from the competent authority, or an OCI/PIO card of parents or spouse along with the base papers/documents upon which the OCI/PIO card was issued. Applicants may also submit any other evidence that may substantiate their claim. Usually, applicants are able to submit a certificate of residence or place of birth of self/parents/grandparents from First Class Magistrate/District Magistrate (DM) of the concerned place.

If the applicant cites their Indian origin as basis for registration as OCI holder, they must provide evidence of their relationship with the person cited as parent/grandparent/great grandparent. The document of relationship could be a birth certificate issued from competent authority mentioning both parents' names. In case the birth certificate is issued by a foreign authority, it must be apostilled or endorsed by the concerned Indian diplomatic mission abroad. In the case of a minor child whose parents are both Indian citizens or who has at least one parent holding Indian citizenship, evidence may comprise a copy of the child's birth certificate that mentions its parents, a copy of Indian passport of at least one of the parents or copy of the Domicile Certificate or Nativity Certificate issued by a Competent Authority supporting the Indian origin of at least one parent or any other proof substantiating the status of at least one parent as being either an Indian citizen or being of Indian origin. If the parents are divorced, a court order of dissolution of marriage which specifically mentions that the legal custody of the child is with the parent who is applying for the OCI card must be submitted.

Evidence as spouse of foreign origin of a citizen of India or spouse of foreign origin of an OCI holder may be provided in the form of a registered marriage certificate. In the case of spouse of an Indian citizen, a copy of the Indian passport of the spouse or copy of the Domicile Certificate or Nativity Certificate issued by the Competent Authority in respect of the Indian spouse or any other proof substantiating the status of the spouse as being an Indian citizen. In the case of spouse of an OCI holder, a copy of the present valid passport of the spouse and copy of the OCI card of the spouse and copies of the documents upon which the OCI card was issued to the spouse.

OCI reissuance advisory upon getting a new passport

 For an applicant who is 19 years of age or younger, a copy of the current passport and current passport-sized photo must be re-uploaded onto the OCI online portal every time a new passport is issued. There is no need to re-issue OCI. Uploading documents will be provided on gratis basis to the OCI holders.
 For an applicant who is 20 to 49 years of age, OCI must be re-issued the first time a new passport is issued after age 20.
 For an applicant who is 50 years of age or older, a copy of the current passport and current passport-sized photo must be re-uploaded onto the OCI online portal the first time a new passport is issued after age 50. There is no need to re-issue OCI. Uploading documents will be provided on gratis basis to the OCI holders.

Privileges and restrictions
Overseas Citizenship of India allows a holder:

 Multiple entry, multi-purpose lifelong visa-free visits to India.
 Exemption from registering with the Foreigners Regional Registration Officer (FRRO) of India on their arrival in the country or for any length of stay in India, unless there is a change of permanent home address or occupation.
 Parity with Indian citizens for domestic airfares and admission fees for national parks, wildlife sanctuaries, national monuments, historical sites, and museums.
 Parity with NRIs for most economic, financial, and educational fields, except in the acquisition of agricultural or plantation properties.
 Parity with foreign nationals for any other field not mentioned in 3 and 4.
 Visits to India for the purpose of conducting research after obtaining a No Objection/Research Project Clearance Certificate from Ministry of Home Affairs (MHA), India and that can be applied at nearest Indian Diplomatic Mission. This includes Scholars awarded Scholarship under Fulbright or any other scheme.

OCI holders are not citizens of India from a constitutional point of view and will not enjoy the following rights even if residing in India:
 they do not have the right to vote.
 they do not have the right to hold the offices of Prime Minister, President, Vice President, Chief Minister, Governor, Judge of Supreme Court and High Court, member of Lok Sabha, Rajya Sabha, Legislative Assembly, or Council.
 they do not have the right to any public services (government jobs).
 they do not have the right to invest in farmland (agricultural property). However, they can still inherit farmland.
 they are not eligible for an Inner Line Permit. Overseas Citizens of India need to apply for a protected area permit to perform certain activities and visit certain areas in India.
OCI holders must always possess a valid foreign passport throughout their stay in India. In the even of expiry of International passport during their stay in India, the OCI holder need to apply for legalisation/registration at FRRO which involves penalty up to INR20,000 (https://indianfrro.gov.in/eservices/Financial_Penalty.pdf). 

Though not actual dual citizenship, the privileges afforded by acquiring an OCI card are now such that multi-national companies are finding it simpler to hire OCI holders, who enjoy a multiple entry, multi-purpose lifelong visa to visit and reside in India, sparing them the need for permits. OCI holders are treated on par with NRIs for most economic, financial, and educational matters and lack only political rights and rights to buy agricultural or plantation properties.

Since they are exempted from registration with the Foreigners Regional Registration Officer (FRRO) on their arrival in the country and can stay or live in India for as long as they wish, OCI holders can travel at very short notice and take up assignments in India, while others could get caught up in bureaucratic delays over their employment visa. So many companies are following an active policy of moving PIOs to India for business expansion. Indian missions overseas are witnessing a deluge in OCI applications, the number of OCI cards issued by diplomatic missions around the world has been steadily rising, with several Indian diplomatic missions grappling with a huge backlog of applications. However, starting from 4 March 2021, OCI holders living in India need to register with the FRRO upon every change of their permanent home address or occupation.

Research on the effects of Overseas Citizenship of India shows three effects:

(a) It enables overseas citizens by granting special privileges.

(b) It affects expectations about privileges.

(c) It eases the transaction process and reduces actual and expected costs and risks through exemptions from formal requirements and by serving as official proof of entitlement.

Privileges of OCI holders depends on the government policy of the day, and there are instances where they are denied additional rights and conveniences afforded to full Indian citizens including citizen NRIs:

 During the 2016 Indian banknote demonetisation where non-citizens, including OCI holders, were denied rights to bring rupee notes back into the country contrary to initial indications.
 OCI holders are sometimes prevented from obtaining admission seats at colleges. In one case this restriction has been overturned by a state high court.

Overseas recognition

Most overseas countries such as United States of America do not recognize the OCI as citizenship of another country. There are however some exceptions.

Statelessness
A stateless person cannot apply for an OCI, however there is an open question if an OCI holder can be considered stateless (if they lose citizenship of the other country), so in countries where citizenship to dual citizens can be revoked, such as Australia or India, an OCI holder may be disadvantaged, however, the lack of precedents in this area means that the issue is uncertain.

United Kingdom
In specific circumstances, acquiring Overseas Citizenship of India prevents British National (Overseas) and British Overseas citizens from registering as full British citizens under Section 4B of the British Nationality Act 1981 (which requires that they have no other citizenship in order to register). It does not prevent them from acquiring full British citizenship by a different method and it does not revoke their British citizenship if they have already registered under Section 4B. The UK government considers that, for purposes of the British Nationality Act 1981, "OCI is considered to be citizenship of another State".  The circumstance where a person can be in this provision is rare, as it means (a) they hold a secondary form of British nationality such as British Overseas citizenship and a passport, (b) they do not hold any other citizenship, and (c) they have been issued an OCI nevertheless.

The British Home Office has confirmed that the Foreign and Commonwealth Office's perspective on OCI status is that it is not a 
form of citizenship. As such, people with OCI are still eligible for 
consular assistance from the FCO whilst in India.

PIO and OCI documents merge
The predecessor to the OCI was the Persons of Indian Origin Card (PIO card). The PIO card was less effective than the OCI, and there was some criticism that holders of the more expensive PIO card were disadvantaged when the OCI scheme launched barely four years later, that there was confusion of the differences between the two, and administration of the two independent schemes caused complexity and confusion.

Prime minister Narendra Modi announced on 28 September 2014 that PIO and OCI cards would be merged. Ultimately this was implemented as:
 A gazetted order published on 30 September 2014 stated a PIO card issued to an applicant shall be valid for their lifetime, provided such applicant has a valid Passport.
 A gazetted order published on 9 January 2015, converted all PIO holders on that date to OCI,
 That second order stopped further applications of the PIO card, and
 Free conversion of PIOs to OCIs was permitted until the extended deadline of 31 December 2017.

PIO holders must apply to convert their existing cards into OCI cards. The Bureau of Immigration stated that it would continue to accept the old PIO cards as valid travel documents until 31 December 2023.

Physical appearance

The OCI document is a passport-like document, even though it is not a passport.

OCI cards issued on or after 15 April 2021 have a blue-grey cover with golden colored printing. The Emblem of India is emblazoned in the centre of the front cover. The words 'भारत गणराज्य' (Hindi) and 'Republic of India' (English) are inscribed above the emblem, and the words 'प्रवासी भारतीय नागरिक कार्ड' (Hindi) and 'Overseas Citizen of India Card' (English) are inscribed below the emblem.

OCI cards issued between 9 January 2015 and 14 April 2021 are identical to the 15 April 2021 ones, except that the words 'प्रवासी भारतीय नागरिक कार्ड' (Hindi) and 'Overseas Citizen of India Card' (English) are inscribed above the emblem, and the words 'भारत गणराज्य' (Hindi) and 'Republic of India' (English) are inscribed below the emblem.

OCI cards issued before 9 January 2015 bore a similar physical appearance as those issued afterward, except the cover was blue instead of blue-grey, the lines inscribed above the Emblem of India were 'Certificate of Registration' and 'Overseas Citizen of India' instead of just 'Overseas Citizen of India Card', and they were printed with a separate lifelong “U” visa stamp (which was pasted on the applicant's passport). The proof of lifelong visa is now just any valid OCI card, with or without the "U" stamp, in conjunction with any valid overseas passport, with or without the "U" stamp, which will be accepted by airlines and Indian customs and police at airport counters when traveling to and from India.

OCI contents

First page (identity) contents

Second page contents
The OCI certificate contains a note:

The note bearing page is typically stamped and signed by the issuing authority.

Final page contents

Persons of Indian Origin Card 

Persons of Indian Origin Card (PIO Card) was a form of identification issued to a Person of Indian Origin who held a passport in a country other than Afghanistan, Bangladesh, Bhutan, China, Iran, Nepal, Pakistan, and Sri Lanka. Accordingly, the Citizenship (Amendment) Act, 2003, made provision for acquisition of Overseas Citizenship of India (OCI) by the Person of Indian Origin (PIOs) of 16 specified countries. It also omitted all provisions recognizing or relating to the commonwealth citizenship from the principle Act. Later, the Citizenship (Amendment) Act, 2005, expanded the scope of grant of OCI for PIOs of all countries except Pakistan as long as their home country allows dual citizenship under their local law in case it recognizes OCI as a second citizenship of India. The OCI is not actually a dual citizenship as the Indian constitution forbids dual nationality (Article 9).

On 9 January 2015, the Person of Indian Origin Card scheme was withdrawn by the Government of India and was merged with the Overseas Citizen of India card scheme. All currently held PIO cards are treated as OCI cards. PIO holders will get a special stamp in their existing PIO card, saying "lifelong validity" and "registration not required", thus making them equal to existing OCI cards. An extended deadline was given where the card could be converted for free to an OCI until 31 December 2017.

PIO holders can use their PIO card to travel to India until 31 December 2023. Effective 1 January 2024, PIO holders' entry to India will be refused.

Conditions
The conditions for issuing a PIO card to a person were:
 Any person who has ever held an Indian passport, or
 The person's parents, grandparents, or great grandparents were born in and were permanent residents of India and never moved to (i.e., were never nationals of) Bangladesh and Pakistan, or
 The person is the spouse of a citizen of India or of a PIO and has been so for two years or more, and
 The person and his/her parents, grandparents, or great grandparents must not have been a national of Bangladesh or Pakistan at any point of time.

The PIO card programme came into effect on 15 September 2002.

Uses
The various benefits available to a PIO holders were:
 Visa-free entry into India during the 15-year period of validity of PIO card.
 Exemption from the requirement of registration if stay in India does not exceed six months. Should the continuous stay exceed six months, registration with the FRRO is required.
 Parity with non-resident Indians in respect of facilities available to the latter in economic, financial, and educational fields.
 All facilities in the matter of acquisition, holding, transfer, and disposal of immovable properties in India except in matters relating to the acquisition of agricultural/plantation properties.
 Facilities available to children of non-resident Indians for getting admission to educational institutions in India, including medical colleges, engineering colleges, Indian Institutes of Technology, Indian Institutes of Management, etc, under the general categories.
 Facilities available under the various housing schemes of LIC, State Governments, and other Government agencies.

Persons with a PIO were not:
 eligible to vote.
 eligible for an Inner Line Permit. They had to apply for a Protected Area Permit.

Registration/Residential Permit
Earlier, PIO holders needed to register with the appropriate FRRO if they were planning to stay in India for more than 180 days. This requirement was not applicable for minors. However, on 30 September 2014, this requirement was removed.

The FRRO used to issue a "Residential Permit For PIO" which was typically valid till the expiry of the PIO holder's passport. On 28 September 2014, Prime Minister Narendra Modi announced at Madison Square Garden (New York) that PIO holders would be granted lifelong visas.

It is important to note that while an Indian citizen can enjoy unlimited visa free visits to Nepal and Bhutan, this is not possible for a PIO/OCI holder.

OCI related incidents
 OCI cards need to be reissued periodically, even though they are termed as lifelong.
 OCI holders are not eligible for repatriation privilege from the Government of India.
 OCI holders eligible through marriage lose OCI status upon divorce.

List of notable people with OCI status
So far about 37.72 lakh OCI cards have been issued by the Government of India as of March 2021.

PIO OCIs

Non-PIO OCIs

See also
 Indian Diaspora

References

External links
 Online OCI services
 
Overseas Citizenship of India (OCI) - Ministry of Home Affairs

 
Indian nationality law
Foreign relations of India
Indian diaspora
Identity documents of India
International travel documents
Residence permit